Hilary Joseph Francis Lofting (23 May 1881 – 3 May 1939) was an Australian novelist, travel writer, journalist and editor.

He was the eldest brother of Hugh Lofting (1886–1947), author of Doctor Dolittle.

Early life and education
Hilary Lofting was born in London, England, to John Brien Lofting  and Elizabeth Agnes Gannon.  He was of English and Irish descent. Lofting was the eldest of five boys and one girl.

Lofting studied Architectural Engineering at St Edmund's College, Cambridge. After graduating, he was involved in railway construction around Ireland, continental Europe and Argentina as a civil engineer. He returned to England after finishing the work, and volunteered for military service, but was twice rejected.

Marriage

In 1915, Lofting married May Wheatcroft in London. The couple moved to Australia in 1917. He was encouraged by friends to write about his experiences in Buenos Aires, under the pseudonym of "Francis Brien". His travel writing was well received and caught the eye of David McKee Wright who was editor of The Bulletin, and published Lofting's writing.  Lofting decided to be a full-time writer and quit civil engineering, but May was opposed to his career change.

The following year, Lofting was remarried to Margaret Fane, who was Wright's ex-wife.  Lofting and Fane collaborated on short stories published in The Sydney Mail, The Sydney Morning Herald and other magazines. Lofting was friends with Christopher Brennan, who spent more than a year in Lofting's house until 1926.

Death
In 1939, Lofting died in the Sydney suburb of Manly. He was listed alongside Edward J. O'Brien, Henry Handel Richardson and Alan Marshall as one of the excellent short story writers in Australia.

Works
 The Happy Vagabond (1928, co-author with Margaret Fane)
 Bail Up!: Ned Kelly, Bushranger (1939)

Introduction
 For the Term of his Natural Life (by Marcus Clarke, 1929 edition)

See also
 List of Australian novelists

Notes

References
 Michael Sharkey / Romantic and modern: country and city in the short stories of Margaret Fane and Hilary Lofting, Journal of the Association for the Study of Australian Literature, Vol 12, No 3 (2012)

External links
 

1881 births
1939 deaths
20th-century Australian novelists
Alumni of St Edmund's College, Cambridge
Australian magazine editors
Australian male short story writers
Australian travel writers
English emigrants to Australia
Engineers from London
20th-century Australian short story writers
20th-century Australian male writers
Australian male novelists
20th-century Australian journalists